A non-convergent discourse (NCD) is a discourse in which the participants do not converge in their language, which results in the use of different languages. Alternative names for this phenomenon are asymmetric and bilingual discourse.

The term was introduced by the sociologist Reitze Jonkman. He distinguishes two motivations for people to engage in an NCD:

Insufficient active knowledge of the other participants' language, combined with a good passive knowledge. It usually takes longer for a person learning a foreign language to speak it fluently than to understand it when it is being spoken. This type of NCD is common in the Germanic languages of the Scandinavian-Nordic region of Europe, where the differences between Swedish, Norwegian, and Danish are relatively small, and do not necessarily obstruct use of the participants' native languages. The same occurs between speakers of Dutch and Afrikaans and to a lesser degree between speakers of Italian and Spanish, Portuguese and Spanish (and their respective variants), where it is also possible to understand what the other person is saying as long as it is said slowly; (as such between residents of Spain and Portugal as well as between residents of Brazil and neighboring Spanish-speaking countries). Also, it is possible among speakers of various South-Slavic languages. For instance, a Serbian tourist in Macedonia or Bulgaria will often be able to communicate with locals without ever having studied Bulgarian or Macedonian. Another good example would be north India - Users of Hindi, Urdu, Punjabi, Gujrati understand each other very well while speaking their mother tongue. In East India, Bengali and Assamese speakers can usually understand one another's speech. Also in South India, Tamil and Malayalam Speakers are often able to understand each other and converse in their native languages to each other while understanding the bulk of the conversation.  In some areas where bilingualism is common, this can also be done with languages that are not mutually intelligible if both speakers are assumed to understand the other's language, as is the case in cities like Montreal.
Ethnic marking: the use of a preferred variety, in order to stress one's belonging to a certain cultural or ethnic group. This occurs in Northern Germany, for example, where speakers of Low German and standard German do not converge.

A third motivation for engaging in an NCD lies on the personal level. According to Giles' Communication Accommodation Theory, interpersonal contacts are negotiations. In a discourse, people seek to create understanding by stressing common features. However, when this will for creating understanding is not present (for example, in cases where the participants feel a strong dislike for each other), they dissociate from each other by stressing the differences. The use of different languages might be the result of such a dissociation strategy.

Sometimes the motivation for engaging in an NCD is misunderstood, especially in contexts where they are uncommon. NCD participants with an ethnic marking strategy might be wrongly interpreted as if they were expressing dislike. This type of misunderstanding is especially common among speakers who come from monolingual areas and find themselves in a bilingual area, where a second language is used alongside their own and NCDs are common.

See also 
Mutual intelligibility

References 

Sociolinguistics
Multilingualism
Bilingualism